The Saleina Hut (French: Cabane de Saleina, formerly spelled Saleinaz) is a mountain hut in the Swiss Alps at 2,691 meters above sea level. It can be reached from the Val Ferret. The hut lies above the Saleina Glacier near the Aiguille d'Argentière in the Mont Blanc Massif, and has places for 48 people and is wardened between mid-June to mid-September.

External links 
Web page of the Swiss Alpine Club
Cabane de Saleina on French IGN mapping portal

Mountain huts in Switzerland
Mountain huts in the Alps